Texoreddellia is a genus of nicoletiids in the family Nicoletiidae. There is one described species in Texoreddellia, T. texensis.

References

Further reading

 
 

Insects
Monotypic insect genera
Articles created by Qbugbot